Grace Episcopal Church is an historic frame Episcopal church located at Mt. Vernon, Somerset County, Maryland. Built in 1846–1847, it is a single-story, three-bay Carpenter Gothic-style church on a brick foundation.  Also on the property is a 19th and 20th century cemetery.

It was listed on the National Register of Historic Places in 1990.

References

External links
, including photo from 1986, at Maryland Historical Trust

Episcopal church buildings in Maryland
Churches on the National Register of Historic Places in Maryland
Churches in Somerset County, Maryland
Churches completed in 1846
19th-century Episcopal church buildings
Carpenter Gothic church buildings in Maryland
National Register of Historic Places in Somerset County, Maryland